The California State Convention of Colored Citizens (CSCCC) was a series of colored convention events active from 1855 to 1902. The convention was one of several social movement conventions that took place in the mid-19th century in many states across the United States.

Description 
These events were composed of individuals such as Peter Lester (1814–?), Mifflin Wistar Gibbs, Thomas Marcus Decatur Ward,  Edward Duplex, Peter William Cassey, and Jeremiah Burke Sanderson; as well as organizations including churches, literary societies, and social groups from across the state. The goal of these events included the abolishment of slavery, the right to Black testimony, to gain voting rights for Black men, and Black access to public education and public accommodations.

History

1855 Sacramento 
The first CSCCC event was held on November 20–22, 1855 at Saint Andrews African Methodist Episcopal Church (St. Andrews A.M.E. Church) in Sacramento. The event had 49 delegates that represented 10 counties (out of 27 total counties). In the mid-1850s after the first CSCC, Jonas H. Townsend and Mifflin Wistar Gibbs founded the Mirror of the Times, an African American weekly newspaper in San Francisco; which was financially supported by the CSCC. Edward Duplex served as a delegate from Yuba County for the first event.

1856 Sacramento 
The second CSCCC event was held on December 9–12, 1865 at the same St. Andrews A.M.E. Church in Sacramento. The 1865 event was shaped by the American Civil War ending and the political issues in the state including Governor Leland Stanford's repeal of California’s testimony ban in 1863. Edward Duplex served as the state executive committee member during the second event.

1857 San Francisco 
The third CSCCC event was held on October 13–?, 1857 at St. Cyprian's African Methodist Episcopal Church in San Francisco, a church led by Rev. Thomas Marcus Decatur Ward.

1865 Sacramento 
The CCSCC event held on December 11–?, 1865 in Sacramento came to a resolution to tax each Black person in order to support and fund Black education, and at the time there was only one secondary school in the state accepting Black students, the Phoenixonian Institute (opened in 1861) in San Jose, California. Rev. Peter William Cassey had helped organize the 1865 event.

List of events 
 1855 California State Convention of Colored Citizens, Sacramento
 1856 California State Convention of Colored Citizens, Sacramento
 1857 California State Convention of Colored People, San Francisco
 1863 California State Convention of Colored People, San Jose
 1865 California State Convention of Colored Citizens, Sacramento
 1880 California State Convention of Colored People, San Francisco
 1889 State Convention of the California Afro-American League
 1902 State Convention of the California Afro-American League, Oakland

See also 
 African Americans in California
 New York State Convention of Colored Citizens
 Pennsylvania State Equal Rights League Convention
 Sweet Vengeance Mine

References

Further reading 
 

Colored Conventions
Abolitionist conventions in the United States
African Americans' rights organizations
History of African-American civil rights
1855 in California
1855 establishments in California
1902 disestablishments in California